Dyschirius laevifasciatus is a species of ground beetle in the subfamily Scaritinae. It was described by G. Horn in 1878.

References

laevifasciatus
Beetles described in 1878